Jo Biwi Se Kare Pyaar is an Indian television series which aired on SAB TV from 28 October 2013 to 20 December 2013. It is India's first fiction cooking show. The show's distinctive format received positive reviews, and almost two years later, in 2015, Chalti Ka Naam Gaadi was announced as a newly updated version of this show with a new format.

Synopsis
Jo Biwi Se Kare Pyaar is a show about a newly married working couple Aditya and Suhani Khanna who as amateurs cook try to improve their hand at cooking after getting inspired on their anniversary by Prestige Smart Kitchen appliances and cookware that makes cooking fun and easy. They realize that the cooking time is the only time that can bring them together after the long day's work and hence decide to cook together every day thereby improving their culinary skills and simultaneously rekindle their romance in the kitchen that was being affected by their busy work schedules.

Cast 
 Arjun Bijlani as Aditya Khanna
 Shweta Gulati as Suhani Aditya Khanna  
 Gungun Uprari as Naina Mohit Khanna
 Rakesh Paul as Mohit Khanna   
 Amit Behl as Mr. Batra 
 Shivaam Jaggdish as Various characters
 Anang Desai as Suhani's Boss

References

External links

Sony SAB original programming
Hindi-language television shows
2013 Indian television series debuts
2013 Indian television series endings